Natasha Anne Bedingfield (born 26 November 1981) is a British singer and songwriter. Bedingfield released her debut album, Unwritten, in 2004, which contained primarily up-tempo pop songs and was influenced by R&B music. It enjoyed international success with more than 2.3 million copies sold worldwide. Bedingfield received a Grammy Award nomination for Best Female Pop Vocal Performance for the title track "Unwritten", and at the 2005 and 2006 Brit Awards, she was nominated for Best British Female Artist. Unwritten also produced her only UK number one, "These Words".

Her second album, N.B. (2007), yielded the UK top 10 singles "I Wanna Have Your Babies" and "Soulmate". N.B. was not released in North America, but six tracks from it were included with seven new ones and released in 2008 as her third studio album, Pocketful of Sunshine, with the singles "Love Like This" and "Pocketful of Sunshine" earning success on the charts. In December 2010, Bedingfield released her third album in North America, Strip Me, with the song of the same name charting on the US Billboard Hot 100 at 91. Bedingfield has sold over 10 million albums and 10 million singles worldwide, totalling over 20 million records worldwide. In 2012, VH1 ranked Bedingfield number 66 on the list of 100 Greatest Women in Music.

Early life
Bedingfield spent time in Auckland, New Zealand during her childhood, and attended Lynfield College. When Bedingfield was a teenager, she and her siblings, Daniel and Nikola, formed the dance/electronic group, The DNA Algorithm. The group provided Bedingfield with the opportunity to explore different musical genres and expand her songwriting abilities. She provided vocals for the group which primarily performed dance-pop music about independence and empowerment, themes that would later be found in her own solo compositions. At age 14, Bedingfield sang vocals on Origins Refined Intricacy (Steelyard Records).

Bedingfield attended a year at the University of Greenwich, where she studied psychology, then left to concentrate on singing and songwriting. At first, she recorded demos in the garages of friends who had recording studios, which she presented to record companies. In early 2000s, Bedingfield composed, wrote and recorded songs for Hillsong Church UK. Her songs appeared on the live albums Blessed, Shout God's Fame, and the children's album Jesus Is My Superhero by Hillsong Music Australia.

Career

2003–2006: Early years and Unwritten
 Bedingfield was introduced to Phonogenic founder and A&R Paul Lisberg by the artist's manager Gary Wilson. Lisberg was initially hesitant, later telling HitQuarters: "[They] were good but weren't right for us ... " However, it was when, at a meeting together, Lisberg heard her singing ability and creative vocal ad-libbing first-hand that he became excited by Bedingfield's potential. Label interest was later confirmed when a trial studio session together with writers Steve Kipner and Andrew Frampton produced songs that were in keeping with Lisberg's vision for Phonogenic. Bedingfield signed a recording contract with BMG UK & Ireland, through its imprint Phonogenic Records, in July 2003.

Her debut studio album Unwritten was released in September 2004 and featured collaborations with Steve Kipner, Danielle Brisebois, Nick Lachey, James Reilly, Andrew Frampton, Wayne Wilkins, Kara DioGuardi, Guy Chambers, Patrick Leonard and the rapper Bizarre. The album contained uptempo pop-rock songs and influences from R&B music. Bedingfield's lyrics focused on independence, opportunism and female empowerment. Reviews of the album were generally positive, and it was described as a "well-made pop album for the new millennium" by Allmusic. The album debuted on the UK Albums Chart at number one and reached the top thirty in the U.S. It sold well, reaching multi-platinum status in the UK and Gold status in the U.S. The first single released from the album was "Single", which reached number three on the UK Singles Chart. The song's lyrics and accompanying music video depict Bedingfield's single lifestyle. "These Words" was released as the album's second single. The song became Bedingfield's first UK number one and US top twenty single. "Unwritten" was released as the album's third single in 2004, the song reached number six on the UK Singles Chart and it also became the most played song on US radio in 2006. "I Bruise Easily" was released as the album's fourth single, it did not perform as well as its predecessors but was still a moderate success, reaching number twelve on the UK Singles Chart.

At the 2005 Brit Awards, Bedingfield was nominated for four awards, though did not win any of her nominated categories. She was also nominated for an award at the 2006 Brit Awards, and in 2007, she was nominated for "Best Female Pop Vocal Performance" at the 2007 Grammy Awards, though was again unsuccessful in winning in any of her nominated categories.

2007–2008: N.B. and Pocketful of Sunshine

Bedingfield's second album, N.B., was released in Europe in April 2007. The album received mixed reviews by critics and peaked at number nine in the UK. "I Wanna Have Your Babies", the album's lead single, was moderately successful, reaching number seven in the UK, number eight in Ireland and the top fifty in various other markets. "Soulmate" was released as the album's second single on 2 July 2007 and also peaked at number seven in the UK. To promote N.B., Bedingfield embarked on the FutureSex/LoveShow tour in May 2007.

On 1 July 2007, Bedingfield performed "Unwritten" at the Concert for Diana held at Wembley Stadium, London, an event which celebrated the life of Princess Diana almost ten years after her death. The North American version of her second album, titled Pocketful of Sunshine, featured six songs from N.B.. The album was released on 22 January 2008, after the lead single, "Love like This", was released in September 2007 and charted at No. 11 on the Billboard Hot 100. The title track was released as the second single in February 2008 and peaked at No. 5 on the Billboard Hot 100. On 18 January 2008, Bedingfield's UK tour was cancelled for the second time, one month before it was supposed to start, so she could spend more time promoting her album in the U.S. In August 2008, Bedingfield and other singers including Beyoncé, Rihanna, Melissa Etheridge, Carrie Underwood, Miley Cyrus, Leona Lewis and Mariah Carey recorded the charity single, "Just Stand Up" produced by Babyface and L.A. Reid, to support "Stand Up to Cancer". On 5 September 2008, the singers performed it live on TV.

2009–2011: Strip Me and Strip Me Away

Bedingfield stated on her blog that she would start work on her new album in early 2009. She was confirmed to be writing for the new album while on holiday in New Zealand; she said "I'm here for a couple of weeks to do a bit of writing. It is such an inspiring place to write music. I love coming here as often as I can, usually once a year to fuel up on ideas for my next album".
She also confirmed she was working with Brian Kennedy, who produced/co-wrote Rihanna's hit single "Disturbia" and was writing songs with him while on tour to have the album released by the end of 2009. Bedingfield also stated that Wyclef Jean, Sam Sparro and Mike Elizondo would be working on the record.

In an interview with IN:DEMAND Producer, Ryan Tedder said: "I'm gonna try and bring Natasha Bedingfield back here in the UK with some quirky, kinda weird stuff". On 18 March Bedingfield stated on her official site that she was in Los Angeles and she was putting the finishing touches on her album. "Touch", the lead single from the album, was made available as a digital download 18 May 2010. Bedingfield performed the song on The Ellen DeGeneres Show on 24 May 2010. "Touch" was officially sent to US radio stations on 29 June 2010. On 15 July Bedingfield announced via Twitter that the title of her new album would be Strip Me. The album was originally scheduled for release on 9 November 2010 but was released on 7 December. The second single, also titled "Strip Me", was sent to US radio on 30 August 2010 and it became available as a digital download on 21 September 2010. It was written by Bedingfield, Ryan Tedder and Wayne Wilkins. The song was selected to head the soundtrack for the 2010 comedy Morning Glory. Bedingfield appeared on rapper Nicki Minaj's debut album, Pink Friday, on a track called "Last Chance", and on Rascal Flatts' album Nothing Like This on a track called "Easy", released as the album's third single. On New Year's Eve 2010–11, Bedingfield appeared on Dick Clark's New Year's Rockin' Eve.

In 2010, Bedingfield joined forces with Avon as a celebrity judge for Avon Voices, Avon's first-ever global, online singing talent search for women and songwriting competition for men and women. On 6 April 2011, Bedingfield visited Radio Hamburg and confirmed that the song "Pocketful of Sunshine" (originally the second single from her US album "Pocketful of Sunshine") would be the first European single from the forthcoming European release of Strip Me. The European version of Strip Me will be called Strip Me Away. The lead single "Pocketful of Sunshine" was released on 13 May in Germany. The album "Strip Me Away" will be released in June. Bedingfield was featured on Simple Plan's new single from their new album Get Your Heart On!, released on 21 June 2011. The song, "Jet Lag" was released on 26 April 2011 as the band's first single from their fourth album. On 5 July, Bedingfield performed her song "Weightless" from her "Strip Me" album on The Tonight Show with Jay Leno. Filipino singer Jake Zyrus confirmed that Bedingfield had written a song for her called "Lighthouse", which is included on her second studio album Infinity. On 9 November 2011, Bedingfield wowed American audiences when she joined Rascal Flatts to perform "Easy," on the Country Music Awards show on ABC. Bedingfield has released a Christmas song 'Shake Up Christmas', which has been confirmed to be on the 2011 Coca-Cola Christmas television advertisements.

2012–2017: Other projects

In April 2012, Bedingfield announced that she was working on her fourth studio album, originally titled The Next Chapter, mentioning her plans to release the album worldwide, not just focusing on America. The album was said to feature production from RedOne, Dr. Luke, Benny Blanco, Paul Williams and Marshall Altman. The Next Chapter was presumably scrapped or shelved, given that it never materialized after that. In September 2012, Bedingfield was featured on Lifehouse's single "Between the Raindrops". On 13 May 2013, she appeared as a guest judge on the New Zealand version of The X Factor alongside her brother Daniel Bedingfield.

In 2013, Bedingfield composed the music of "Non mi ami", a single by Italian singer-songwriter Giorgia, included on the album Senza Paura. In 2014, Bedingfield contributed to the soundtrack for the Disney animated film, The Pirate Fairy, with a track titled "Who I Am". On 13 January 2015, Bedingfield released a charity single with Philosophy Skin Care titled "Hope". With the release of "Hope", Bedingfield announced via Twitter that she would become more publicly active again, promising "many more music releases to come". The release of the music video for "Hope" followed a day later. Later in 2015, Bedingfield contributed to Band of Merrymakers' album Welcome to Our Christmas Party and toured with the group in 2015 and 2016. Bedingfield also collaborated with Belgian record producer Basto during this time. The duo released a single titled "Unicorn" in March 2016.

Bedingfield toured Europe in late 2016 with Night of the Proms. In January 2017 it was announced that Bedingfield would open for Train's 2017 summer concert tour. On 10 March 2017 she appeared on the Soundtrack of Tangled: Before Ever After in the track "More Of Me".

2018–present: Roll with Me
Bedingfield released a new record, "Let Go" with Nestea on 17 March 2018. She signed a record deal with Linda Perry's record label We Are Hear in the same year. Bedingfield co-wrote the song "Black Sky" with Kimbra for her 2018 album Primal Heart. In July 2019, Bedingfield announced that her fourth studio album and first studio release in nearly nine years, Roll with Me, is scheduled for release on 30 August 2019. Before the announcement, she had released the song "Roller Skate" as the album's lead single on 19 July and was preceded by its second single "Kick It".

Philanthropy
Bedingfield has donated time and money to organisations such as the Global Angels, an international children's charity founded by her mother, Molly Bedingfield. She became associated with the organisation in 2006 and said she hoped to help "people around the world, particularly children, who live in conditions that would horrify us".

Bedingfield is now an ambassador for Global Angels, and in November 2006 she visited India for three weeks in support of the charity. She visited an orphanage in Kolkata and a refugee camp for former child prostitutes in Mumbai to learn more about the situation and the conditions in these areas. Bedingfield later expressed her shock at what she had witnessed. Video diaries filmed during her trip were posted on her official website in early 2007. She is also an advocate for Stop the Traffik, a global coalition which works to end human trafficking and a member of the (RED) campaign. In a 2008 rockumentary, Call+Response, headed by Justin Dillon, Bedingfield performed acoustic versions of "Unwritten" and "Soulmate" in support of the film's cause: a movement against modern slavery and human trafficking.

Non-musical projects 

In 2004, Bedingfield showed interest in acting and made her debut in the James Bond video game From Russia with Love in November 2005. She voiced the character Elizabeth Stark, the British Prime Minister's daughter who is kidnapped in the opening sequence. Bedingfield commented that she would like to do more acting, but only if the film "was good enough, and it was a role that [would] fit me." She has made an appearance in the seventh-season finale of the Canadian television series Degrassi: The Next Generation. Bedingfield also guest-starred on Nickelodeon's mockumentary series The Naked Brothers Band "Christmas Special" alongside Whoopi Goldberg and Leon Thomas III. She has made guest appearances on the NBC series Lipstick Jungle.

She guest-starred on Nickelodeon's True Jackson, VP in November 2009. She sang the song "These Words". In 2012, Bedingfield made an appearance in three episodes of Web Therapys fourth season.

In December 2012, VH1 announced that Bedingfield would perform at their 2012 VH1 Divas show, a concert benefiting the Save The Music Foundation charity. Bedingfield performed Deee-Lite's "Groove Is in the Heart" with Bootsy Collins and Iggy Azalea.

On 22 September 2014, Bedingfield performed a song titled "Love Song to the Earth" at the United Nations 2014 Equator Prize Gala in New York City. The song is a special anthem she and Toby Gad co-wrote for the United Nations Climate Summit 2014.

Personal life
On 21 March 2009, Bedingfield married American businessman Matt Robinson in Malibu, California, US. In November 2017, their son was born.

Discography

 Unwritten (2004)
 N.B. (2007)
 Strip Me (2010)
 Roll with Me (2019)

Tours
Headlining
Verizon VIP Tour 
Less Is More Tour 
Roll With Me Tour 

Co-headlining
Energy Music Tour 
Night of the Proms 

Opening act
C'mon C'mon Tour  
FutureSex/LoveShow 
New Kids on the Block Live 
Play That Song Tour 

Filmography
Television

Video games

Awards and nominations

Bedingfield's debut album Unwritten contained primarily uptempo pop songs and was influenced by R&B music. It enjoyed international success with over three million copies sold worldwide. In 2007, she received a Grammy Award nomination for "Best Female Pop Vocal Performance" for the song "Unwritten", the third single from the album of the same name. Bedingfield's second album N.B. yielded the singles "Soulmate"; "Say It Again"; and "I Wanna Have Your Babies", written and produced by Natasha Bedingfield, Wayne Wilkins, Andrew Frampton and Steve Kipner. Bedingfield has received four nominations from the BRIT Awards but has won none. As of July 2008, she has won five awards from eleven nominations.

Billboard Music Awards
The Billboard Music Awards honor artists for commercial performance in the U.S., based on record charts published by Billboard. The awards are based on sales data by Nielsen SoundScan and radio information by Nielsen Broadcast Data Systems. The award ceremony was held from 1990 to 2007, until its reintroduction in 2011.

|-
| 2006
| "Unwritten"
| Pop 100 Airplay Song of the Year
| 
|-
| rowspan=2|2008
| rowspan=2|Herself
| Top Hot Dance Club Play Artist
| 
|-
| Top Hot Dance Airplay Artist
| 

Billboard Touring Awards
Established in 2004, the Billboard Touring Awards is an annual meeting sponsored by Billboard magazine which also honors the top international live entertainment industry artists and professionals. 

|-
| 2011
| Natasha Bedingfield Less Is More Tour Presented By Freschetta 
| Concert Marketing & Promotion Award
| 

BRIT Awards
The BRIT Awards are the British Phonographic Industry's annual pop music awards. Bedingfield has received four nominations.

|-
|rowspan=4|  ||rowspan=3| Natasha Bedingfield || British Female Solo Artist || 
|-
| British Breakthrough Act || 
|-
| British Pop Act || 
|-
| "These Words" || British Single || 

BT Digital Music Awards
The BT Digital Music Awards honour music distributed digitally by methods such as mobile devices, online downloads and blogging. Bedingfield has won one award.

|-
| 2005
| rowspan=3|Natasha Bedingfield
| Best Use of Mobile
| 
|-
| rowspan=2|2007 || Artist of the Year || 
|-
| Best Pop Artist || 

Glamour Awards

!Ref.
|-
| 2005
| Natasha Bedingfield 
| UK Solo Artist 
| 
| 

Grammy Awards
The Grammy Awards are awarded annually by the National Academy of Recording Arts and Sciences. Bedingfield has received one nomination.

|-
|  || "Unwritten" || Best Female Pop Vocal Performance || 

Ivor Novello Awards
The Ivor Novello Awards are awarded for songwriting and composing. The awards, named after the Cardiff born entertainer Ivor Novello, are presented annually in London by the British Academy of Songwriters, Composers and Authors (BASCA).

|-
| 2005
| "These Words"
| Best Song Musically And Lyrically
| 

MTV Europe Music Awards
The MTV Europe Music Awards is an annual awards ceremony established in 1994 by MTV Europe. Bedingfield has received one nomination.

|-
| 2004 || Natasha Bedingfield || Best UK and Ireland act || 

Meteor Music Awards
Launched in 2001, the Meteor Music Awards are awarded for achievements in the Irish and international record industry. 

|-
| 2005
| Herself
| Best International Female 
| 

Music Video Production Awards
The MVPA Awards are annually presented by a Los Angeles-based music trade organization to honor the year's best music videos.

|-
| rowspan=3 | 2006
| rowspan=3 | "These Words"
| Best Pop Video
| 
|-
| Best Colorist/Telecine
| 
|-
| Best Special Effects
| 

New Music Awards
The New Music Awards''' are given for excellence in music to both recording artists and radio stations by New Music Weekly magazine.

|-
| 2006
| "Unwritten"
| AC Single of the Year
| 
|-
| 2008
| Natasha Bedingfield
| AC Female Artst of the Year
| 

People's Choice Awards
The People's Choice Awards is an American awards show recognising the people and the work of popular culture. The show has been held annually since 1975 and is voted on by the general public.

|-
| 2009
| "Love Like This" (feat. Sean Kingston)
| Favourite Combined Forces
| 

Pop Awards
Pop Magazine is an online music magazine created by Hotspot Entertainment and published by A-Z Publishings. The magazine was launched on April 24, 2014. In 2018, Pop Magazine launched the first annual Pop Awards with 25 nominees across 5 categories.

|-
| 2020
| "Roller Skate"
| Song of the Year
| 

Radio Disney Music Awards
The Radio Disney Music Awards (RDMA) is an annual awards show which is operated and governed by Radio Disney, an American radio network. Beginning in 2013, the ceremony began to be televised on Disney Channel.

|-
| 2006
| "Unwritten"
| Best Song to Listen to While Getting Ready for School
| 

Smash Hits Poll Winners Party
The Smash Hits Poll Winners Party was an awards ceremony which ran from 1988 to 2005. Each award winner was voted by readers of the Smash Hits'' magazine.

|-
|rowspan=2|2004
| Herself
| Hot New Talent
| 
|-
| "These Words"
| Favorite Download
| 

TMF Awards
The TMF Awards is an annual television awards show broadcast live on The Music Factory. Bedingfield has received one award.

|-
| 2005 || Natasha Bedingfield || Best International New Artist || 

Teen Choice Awards
The Teen Choice Awards were established in 1999 to honor the year's biggest achievements in music, movies, sports and television, being voted by young people aged between 13 and 19.

|-
| 2006
| Natasha Bedingfield
| Choice Music: Breakout Artist - Female
| 

Žebřík Music Awards

!Ref.
|-
| 2004
| Natasha Bedingfield
| Best International Surprise
| 
|

See also
List of songs written by Natasha Bedingfield

References

External links

 
1981 births
Living people
English people of New Zealand descent
Alumni of the University of Greenwich
British contemporary R&B singers
English dance musicians
English women singer-songwriters
Hillsong musicians
English expatriates in the United States
English women pop singers
Third British Invasion artists
21st-century English women singers
21st-century English singers
BT Digital Music Awards winners
People educated at Lynfield College